The W.A. Franke College of Forestry & Conservation, formerly the University of Montana College of Forestry and Conservation, is a college within the University of Montana. It was created by an act of the Thirteenth Montanan Legislative Assembly in 1913 to meet the great and growing demand on the part of lumber companies, large timber holding corporations, and the national and state governments.

Laboratories and Stations
The W.A. Franke College of Forestry and Conservation has access to well-equipped laboratories, extensive computer technology, and field stations: 

 The  Lubrecht Experimental Forest
 The  Bandy Ranch

Faculty and scientists in its centers and institutes conduct research across a broad range of natural resource and environmental science disciplines, from wildland fire to wildlife management: 
 Avian Science Center 
 Bolle Center for People and Forests
 Institute for Tourism & Recreation Research
 International Seminar on Protected Area Management
 Montana Climate Office
 Rocky Mountains Cooperative Ecosystem Studies Unit
 U.S. Fish Fish & Wildlife Service Grizzly Bear Recovery Program
 Wilderness Institute

Program
The W.A. Franke College of Forestry and Conservation houses five undergraduate majors, six minors, and four undergraduate certificates. Students can choose from six master's degree programs, three PhD programs, and four graduate certificate programs. The Wildlife Biology program was ranked number one in the country by Academic Analytics in 2016.

Building
The Forestry Building is one of the oldest buildings on campus. It was built in the Renaissance Revival style specified by Carsley-Gilbert's master plan in 1922.

External links

Schools and colleges of the University of Montana
Educational institutions established in 1913
Forestry education
1913 establishments in Montana